Niang pao is a derogatory Chinese term for men perceived to be effeminate.

Overview 
Niang pao literally translates to "girlie guns / girlie cannons" but is more commonly translated as "sissy". It is generally used as an insult for effeminate men. Because of this it is considered to be a gender based slur.

History 
The Chinese Communist Party (CCP) used the term in a 2018 Xinhua item intended to show its preference for the portrayal of virile Chinese men on the Internet. 

In 2018, the official WeChat account of People’s Daily published a commentary denouncing “such derogatory phrases including ‘niangpao,’” and called for respect and tolerance of diversified aesthetics.

In 2019 Chinese Academy of Social Sciences endorsed the theory that the United States Central Intelligence Agency initiated the phenomenon with a deliberate "campaign to 'brainwash' Asian men" starting in 1962 in Japan with the Johnny & Associates talent agency.

The National Radio and Television Administration used the term in a 2021 edict condemning the television portrayal of effeminate men, as part of CCP general secretary Xi Jinping's broader crackdown on gender differences and non-conforming social identities. The Guardian noted Chinese television programs Youth With You and Produce 101 as examples that were targeted.

See also
 Little fresh meat

References

Further reading

Chinese slang
Effeminacy
Gay effeminacy
Pejorative terms for men